Traffics and Discoveries is a collection of poems and short stories by Rudyard Kipling, published by Macmillan and Co. of London and Doubleday, Page of New York in 1904.

Stories (11):
 The Captive
 The Bonds of Discipline
 A Sahibs' War
 "Their Lawful Occasions" (as Part I and Part II)
 The Comprehension of Private Copper
 Steam Tactics
 "Wireless"
 The Army of a Dream (as Part I and Part II)
 "They"
 Mrs. Bathurst
 Below the Mill Dam

One poem precedes each story, as in many Kipling collections:
From the Masjid-Al-Aqsa of Sayyid Ahmed (Wahabi)
Poseidon's Law
The Runners
The Wet Litany
The King's Task
The Necessitarian
Kaspar's Song in "Varda"
Song of the Old Guard
The Return of the Children
From Lyden's "Irenius"
"Our Fathers Also"

The use of italic font for all poem titles only follows the Contents list in the first edition (London: Macmillan and Co., 1904). The use of quotation marks follows that list, and also the story headings and running heads, except that the first edition uses single quotation marks throughout.

See also
 List of the works of Rudyard Kipling
 1904 in literature

References

Works by Rudyard Kipling
Short story collections by Rudyard Kipling